The ridgehead snake (Manolepis putnami) is a species of snake in the family Colubridae. The species is endemic to southeastern Mexico.

Etymology
The specific name, putnami, is in honor of American anthropologist Frederic Ward Putnam.

Taxonomy
M. putnami is the type species of the monotypic genus Manolepis.

Geographic range
M. putnami is found in the Mexican states of Chiapas, Colima, Guerrero, Jalisco, Nayarit, and Oaxaca.

Habitat
The natural habitat of M. putnami is forest.

Description
Dorsally, it is pale brown or yellowish, with a brown, darker-edged vertebral stripe three scales wide. Ventrally it is whitish, speckled with brown. The dorsal scales are smooth, without apical pits, and in 19 rows at midbody. The anal plate is divided, and the subcaudals are in two rows. 

M. putnami is rear-fanged (opisthoglyphous). It has 15 small, equal maxillary teeth, followed, after a space, by two enlarged grooved fangs. The anterior mandibular teeth are much longer than the posterior.

References

Further reading
Heimes, Peter (2016). Snakes of Mexico: Herpetofauna Mexicana Vol. I. Frankfurt am Main, Germany: Chimaira. 572 pp. .
Jan G (1863). Elenco sistematico degli ofidi descritti e disegnati per l'iconografia generale. Milan: A. Lombardi. vii + 143 pp. (Dromicus putnami, new species, p. 67). (in Italian).

Dipsadinae
Reptiles described in 1863
Reptiles of Mexico
Taxa named by Giorgio Jan